The Patiala gharana is one of the vocal  (tradition, school, or style of music) of Hindustani classical music, named after the city of Patiala in Punjab, India where it was established. The gharana was founded in the mid to late 19th century by Mian Kallu (also known as Kalu-miya Khan), a sārangi player of the Jaipur durbar. He received his musical training from the last Mughal king Bahadur Shah Zafar’s court musician Qutub Bakhsh ‘Tanras’ Khan (Delhi gharana) and went on to become the court musician to the Maharaja of Patiala. Eventually, the mantle was passed on to his son, ‘General’ Ali Baksh Khan and his close friend ‘Colonel’ Fateh Ali Khan, both of whom became court musicians in the court of Maharaja Rajinder Singh. The titles of 'general' and 'colonel' of music were bestowed upon them by the Victor Alexander Bruce, the 9th Earl of Elgin, after the duo had enthralled him with their performance. Their pairing was popularly referred to as 'Ali-a-Fattu ki Jodi.'

Although the Patiala gharana was originally founded by Mian Kallu, it is widely acknowledged that it was Ali Baksh Khan and Fateh Ali Khan who popularised the Patiala tradition of singing and brought it acclaim and attention across the subcontinent. The Patiala gharana was inspired from and influenced by four musical gharanas — Delhi, Gwalior, Riva, and Jaipur, and it is particularly noted for its ghazal, thumri, and khayal styles of singing. Of the numerous vocal gharanas in Hindustani classical music, the Patiala gharana is estimated to have the broadest and most prominent representation on both sides of the India-Pakistan border.

In the latter half of the 20th century, the Patiala style of khayal singing took on two distinct forms. One form gave the music world Ustad Amanat Ali Khan (1922 – 1974) and his brother, Ustad Bade Fateh Ali Khan (1935 – 2017). The other, originating from Kasur, Pakistan, produced Ustad Bade Ghulam Ali Khan (1902 – 1968) and his brother Ustad Barkat Ali Khan (1907 – 1963). Ustad Bade Ghulam Ali Khan is generally acknowledged to be the most influential exponent of the Patiala gharana, while Ustad Amanat Ali Khan is widely considered its most prominent scion. The gharana is now generally referred to as the Kasur-Patiala gharana.

Characteristics

Improvisations 
The Patiala gharana is known to be an amalgamated vocal style of singing and is influenced to some extent by the folk music of Punjab. The Patiala singing tradition is known for its creative improvisations by borrowing freely from other gharanas and merging them aesthetically to enhance the khayal form of singing. The original thumri compositions of Ali Baksh Khan and Fateh Ali Khan were known for their swift taans set in the traditional tappe folk style of Punjab. The influence of these Punjabi tappe as well as the Sindhi Kafi style of singing is said to have substantially altered the Patiala approach to khayal singing.

The Patiala technique of music is noted for its delicate style, use of intricate vocal embellishments (such as gamak, meend, and murki) and for its numerous bandishes — structure-bound "summaries" of ragas. Pandit Iman Das, an exponent of the Patiala gharana from Bangalore, India explains that the distinguishing features of the Patiala style of singing are "long meends, heavy gamaks, electrifying taans, shuddha aakar, bol-banavat, and some elements of Punjabi folk interspersed with surprise elements like murkis and harkats."

A special feature of the Patiala gharana approach to singing is its rendering of intricate . Specifically, singers in the gharana tend to sing from the chest or diaphragm and not with their head voice. Vocalists in the Patiala tradition sing in a strong, open-throated voice with intricate and analytical use of notes in three octaves.

The Patiala singing form tends to favour pentatonic  such as Malkauns for their ornamentation. Pandit Shantanu Bhattacharayya, a well-known Patiala vocalist, notes about the Patiala singing style that "akaars, bol banaavs and bolbants exhibit the temperament of a painter. Each phrase is rendered like colouring a picture — vivid with imagery. There are certain features of this gharana that surface suddenly. Taans and boltaans can intersperse the bandish. There is an element of unpredictability."

Singing style and training 
Singers in the gharana are known for their emotionally evocative and sensual singing style, and particular emphasis is placed on clear diction and enunciation. Patiala exponent Raza Ali Khan states: "the voice culture in this gharana has a beautiful, emotive aspect, and you will see that in all the vocalists who sing this gayaki. You can hear elation, sorrow and mischief, among others, all in the voice." The gharana also has lyrical compositions that have been passed down from generation to generation, and even to disciples and students from outside the family. Singers in the Patiala tradition especially excel in Malkauns, Darbari, Adana, Des, Bhopali, and Multani ragas, according to noted gharana exponent Ustad Hamid Ali Khan. Patiala vocalists are also known for their highly complex expositions of ragas.

Pandit Ajoy Chakrabarty, a noted vocalist in the Patiala tradition today, has explained that Patiala gayaki (singing) is particularly difficult to master and requires dedicated, years-long practice and preparation. He notes that essential requirements of the Patiala manner of singing are correct enunciation (bani), correct voice throw (aakar), correct articulation of scales (sargam) and above all, excellent tayyari (practice). Pandit Iman Das concurs and has stated that the Patiala technique of singing is "an extremely complex style to learn" and requires "rigorous riyaz for years." Vocalists in the Patiala gharana typically perform in pairs. Ustad Hamid Ali Khan explains: "Our ancestors devised this method of singing in pairs, so that the next generation always sticks together. So, while both partners have a full range, in public performances one would take care of the durat (fast tempo) while the other would take on alap (improvised sections of ragas)."

Experimentation 
Exponents of the Patiala gharana are known for their willingness to experiment and blend traditional musical forms with newer genres and styles of music. In an interview, Shafqat Amanat Ali noted: "We are as much rooted to our gharana as we are adapting to modern music. As musicians, we have been embracing modern music. Nobody in my family objected to my singing pop or any other genre. In fact, musicians from Patiala gharana have time and again experimented fearlessly. My father sang ghazals when it was not the taste of classical artistes. He was, in fact, criticised for that. Many classical vocalists were shocked and surprised when we sang Khayal, which again was a bold step for Dhrupad vocalists."

Sufi traditions 
The early Patiala vocalists were known to be associated with Chishti Sufis. This is reflected in the fact that lyrics of many of the gharana's compositions have recurring Sufi leitmotifs — most clearly evident in their signature raga, Ram Saakh which was composed by Mian Kallu himself. In fact, the bandish of this raga alludes to the gharana's devotion to the Sufi master Moinuddin Chishti, also known as Khwājā Ghareeb Nawaz. Later and modern-day Patiala exponents have continued to incorporate elements of Sufi music into their classical and pop compositions.

Marsiya recitations 
The Patiala family (descendants of Ali Baksh Khan and Akhtar Hussain) has a generations-old tradition of performing marsiya, noha, and soz-o-salaam recitations during Muharram to commemorate the martyrdom of Husayn ibn Ali and elegize the events of the Battle of Karbala. "Mujrai Khalq Mein" and "Yeh Sochta Hoon" are among the most well known of these lamentations.

Patiala gharana exponents

19th Century
 Ali Baksh "Jarnail" (1850–1920), founder and member of "Ali-a-Fattu" duo with Fateh Ali "Karnail."
 Fateh Ali "Karnail" ("Taan-Kaptan"), founder and member of "Ali-a-Fattu" duo with Ali Baksh "Jarnail."
 Moujuddin Khan (d. 1920), disciple of Ali-a-Fattu.

20th Century
 Akhtar Hussain Khan (1900–1974)
 Ashiq Ali Khan (d. 1948)
 Chhote Ashiq Ali Khan
 Ata Mohammad Khan, son and disciple of Miyan Jan Khan.
 Bade Ghulam Ali Khan (1902–1968), disciple of Ali Baksh Khan, Kale Khan, and Ashiq Ali Khan.
 Barkat Ali Khan (1908–1963), brother and disciple of Bade Ghulam Ali Khan.
 Ikramul Majid Khan, disciple of Bade Ghulam Ali Khan.
 Abdul Rehman Khan, son and disciple of Ata Mohammad Khan.
 Vasantrao Deshpande (1920–1983), disciple of Ashiq Ali Khan.
 Mohammad Hussain Sarahang (1924–1983), disciple of Ashiq Ali Khan.
 Prasun Banerjee (1926–1997), disciple of Bade Ghulam Ali Khan.
 Meera Banerjee, disciple of Bade Ghulam Ali Khan.
 Lakshmi Shankar  (1926–2013), disciple of Abdul Rehman Khan (1927–1996), disciple of Abdul Rehman Khan.
 Farida Khanum (b. 1929), disciple of Ashiq Ali Khan.
 Amanat Ali Khan (1922–1974), son and disciple of Akhtar Hussain Khan.
 Bade Fateh Ali Khan (1935–2017), son and disciple of Akhtar Hussain Khan.
 Jagdish Prasad (1937–2011), disciple of Bade Ghulam Ali Khan.
 Ghulam Ali (b. 1940), disciple of Bade Ghulam Ali Khan.
 Parveen Sultana (b. 1950), disciple of Ikramul Majid Khan.
 Hamid Ali Khan (b. 1953), son and disciple of Akhtar Hussain Khan.
 Karamat Ali Khan, son and disciple of Bade Ghulam Ali Khan.
 Munawar Ali Khan (1930–1989), son of Bade Ghulam Ali Khan.
 Mazhar Ali Khan (b. 1959), son and disciple of Karamat Ali Khan.
 Jawaad Ali Khan (b. 1962), son and disciple of Karamat Ali Khan.
 Raza Ali Khan (b. 1962), son and disciple of Munawar Ali Khan.

21st Century
Shiv Dayal Batish
Asad Amanat Ali Khan
Shafqat Amanat Ali Khan
Sajjad Ali, disciple of Munawar Ali Khan
Mohammad Aizaz Sohail
Johar Ali Khan
Sanjukta Ghosh
Samrat Pandit
Ajoy Chakraborty, disciple of Munawar Ali Khan
Rahul Deshpande, grandson and disciple of Vasantrao Deshpande
Som Dutt Battu
Iman Das 
Shantanu Bhattacharyya, disciple of Prasun Banerjee & Meera Banerjee
Kaushiki Chakraborty, daughter and disciple of Ajoy Chakraborty

References 

 
Gharana
Vocal gharanas
Music schools in India
Music schools in Pakistan
Indian classical music
Classical music in Pakistan
Hindustani music
Pakistani styles of music
Indian styles of music
Sufi music